Binary backup may refer to:
A Backup consisting of exact, byte-level copies of the original data.
A Byte-Level Incremental backup, which examines file differences at the byte level (in contrast with a Block-Level Incremental Backup).